Swaay is the debut extended play (EP) and by American pop band DNCE, released on October 23, 2015 by Republic Records. The majority of the EP was co-produced and co-written by lead singer and frontman Joe Jonas. The EP debuted at number 39 on the US Billboard 200.

Reception
Kyle Anderson of Entertainment Weekly said of lead singer Joe Jonas on the record "It's still too early to tell whether or not Joe can join Nick in the upper echelon, but the debut EP by his new combo DNCE is a solid step in the right direction." He also said the group "have a spry, playful chemistry" on the EP and that "they've absolutely got the chops and the instincts to carve out a funky, buoyant place on pop radio". Richard Baxter of Popology Now described lead single "Cake by the Ocean" as "one of the quirkiest pop songs of the year", but also stated that compared to the rest of the record it was "just a little appetizer for what the band has been working on". He concluded by saying that "All in all, 'Swaay' provides just enough to leave us wanting more".

Singles
"Cake by the Ocean" was released as the EP's lead single on September 18, 2015. It reached a peak of number 9 on the Billboard Hot 100 in the United States and charted moderately in Australia, Canada and New Zealand.

"Toothbrush" was released as the EP's second single to contemporary hit radio on October 23, 2015.

Track listing

Charts

Weekly charts

Year-end charts

Certifications

Release history

References 

2015 debut EPs
Republic Records EPs
Albums produced by Ilya Salmanzadeh
Albums produced by Mattman & Robin
DNCE EPs